Jingera is a locality in the Snowy Monaro Region, New South Wales, Australia. It lies south of Captains Flat and northeast of Bredbo. It had a public school from 1889 to 1911 and from 1914 to 1941, often operating "half-time".

In 1867, the locality was the site of the ambush and murder of four police constables by the notorious gang led by the Clarke brothers.

References

Snowy Monaro Regional Council
Localities in New South Wales
Southern Tablelands